La Placita, Michoacán, is a small town located in Michoacán, Mexico, near the Pacific coast.

A 7.6 magnitude earthquake struck the area on September 19, 2022.

References

Populated places in Michoacán